Všesportovní stadion is a multi-purpose stadium in Hradec Králové, Czech Republic. It is used mostly for football matches as the home stadium of FC Hradec Králové. The stadium was opened on 11 May 1966. When Hradec were promoted to the Czech First League in 2010, the capacity of the stadium was set to be reduced to 4,000, as league rules determine the capacity to be the number of separate seats. In time for the opening game of the 2010–11 Czech First League, the capacity was increased to 6,000. In the 2011–12 Czech First League, the capacity was increased to 7,220. The stadium was set to be demolished in 2017 and replaced with a new stadium with an increased capacity and suitability for Czech national team matches. The demolition of Všesportovní stadion started on 25 September 2017. The stadium would continue to be used with reduced capacity during the first stage of demolition.

References

External links
 Information at FC Hradec Králové website
 Photo gallery and data at Erlebnis-stadion.de
 Stadium information

Football venues in the Czech Republic
Czech First League venues
FC Hradec Králové
Buildings and structures in Hradec Králové
Sports venues completed in 1966
1966 establishments in Czechoslovakia
Sports venues demolished in 2017
2017 disestablishments in the Czech Republic
Demolished buildings and structures in the Czech Republic
20th-century architecture in the Czech Republic